Imetit is a histamine H3 receptor agonist.

References

Imidazoles